The Macedonian People's League (MPL) was a leftist organization, founded in the USA.

History 
The foundations of the MPL were set by Smile Vojdanov in Pontiac, Michigan in 1929. In 1930, the first conference of the League was held in Toledo, Ohio, with Smile Vojdanov being elected as a chairman of the Central Committee and Georgi Pirinski Sr. as a secretary. The first regular congress of MPL was held in Gary, Indiana in 1931, and since then the Macedonian People's League has been formed. Immediately after its formation, the MPL was associated with various left-wing organizations in the United States and Europe, as well as with the Comintern. 

It established relations with the Comintern's leader Georgi Dimitrov. Dimitrov praised the work of Georgi Pirinski publicized in Daily Worker in August 1935. Pirinski appealed to Bulgarian Americans to heed the call for action by their countryman Dimitrov. In 1938, the MPL was renamed the Macedonian-American People's League, and its branch - the Macedonian-Canadian People's League was founded in the Canada. The League published in Bulgarian language the Weekly "People's Will" (Narodna Volja). 

The organization supported the creation of an independent Macedonia within a Balkan Federation. It was the first organization in the United States to support the idea that Macedonian Slavs constitute a separate nationality. MPL acted aggressively against the Macedonian Patriotic Organization, that it believed, was a Bulgarian agent. During 1940s MPL supported the creation of the People's Republic of Macedonia within Communist Yugoslavia and favored the establishment of Communist regimes throughout Eastern Europe. Finally, because of its pro-Communist stance, the League was disbanded in 1948. The leaders of MPL either chose to leave the country or were deported. Some of them went back to Socialist Bulgaria and became highly placed officials there.

See also
Macedonian-Australian People's League
Macedonian Patriotic Organization
Macedonian nationalism
Macedonian Americans

References

Macedonian-American culture in Michigan
Macedonian American history
Bulgarian-American history
Organizations based in Indiana
Patriotic societies
Organizations established in 1931
1931 establishments in Indiana
Communist organizations in the United States
1948 disestablishments in the United States